The Indianola Carnegie Library is a historic building located in Indianola, Iowa, United States. In November 1902 the local library board submitted a grant application to Andrew Carnegie so they could build a new building. The $10,000 grant was approved on January 13, 1903, and $2,000 was added at a later date. The Indianola City Council agreed to allocate $1,000 a year toward its upkeep. They also bought two lots at the corner of Buxton and Boston. One of the lots was owned by the family of Hannah Babb, the city librarian. Local architect Frederick W. Keith designed the brick Neoclassical structure, and it was built by G.W. James. The library eventually outgrew the building and it was replaced in 1984. The Des Moines Metro Opera has their offices in the old Carnegie building. It was listed on the National Register of Historic Places in 2017.

References

Library buildings completed in 1904
Indianola, Iowa
Buildings and structures in Warren County, Iowa
Neoclassical architecture in Iowa
Libraries on the National Register of Historic Places in Iowa
National Register of Historic Places in Warren County, Iowa
Carnegie libraries in Iowa